Emma Jean Bell (born December 17, 1986) is an American actress, best known for her role as Parker O'Neal in the films Frozen and Hatchet II (both 2010), as Molly Harper in Final Destination 5 (2011), and for playing Amy in the first and third season of The Walking Dead (2010; 2012), and Emma Judith Ryland Brown on the TNT drama series Dallas (2013–2014).

Early life and family
Emma Bell, who was born in Woodbury, New Jersey, grew up in Flemington and the Stanton section of Readington Township and attended Hunterdon Central Regional High School. She moved to New York City at the age of 16. She attended Talent Unlimited High School Performing Arts High School on the Upper East Side of Manhattan.

Her mother, Tessa Horan, was a producer for 60 Minutes, and her father, Robert M. "Rob" Bell, owns Green Birdie Productions, a full-service video production company in Lambertville, New Jersey. Her father was also a reporter, videographer and writer-producer for WWOR-TV. Her brother, Chase Sterling Bell, is a musician. Her paternal grandparents are Ensign Charles Robert Bell and Elise Emma Stone, a Daughter of the American Revolution, both graduates of Swarthmore College in 1939 and he also from the Naval Supply School, Harvard University in 1941, married in Brooklyn on a Sunday, September 14, 1941, and her aunt is Jean Elise Bell. Her great-grandparents were Lieutenant Mead Wilmer Stone, who fought in the First World War and was a co-owner of George Malvese and Company of Garden City Park, in Long Island, and Lillie Seamann.

Career

Bell began her acting career in an Off-Broadway cabaret show in New York at the age of 12. She made her screen debut in 2004, in the episode of NBC drama series Third Watch. She later appeared on Law & Order: Special Victims Unit, and in 2006 starred in the short-lived The WB television series The Bedford Diaries. She also appeared on such other shows as Supernatural, Law & Order, and CSI: Miami. She made her film debut in the 2007 sports drama film Gracie and also appeared in New York City Serenade, Death in Love, and Elektra Luxx.

In 2010, Bell starred as Parker O'Neill, one of the main characters in the film Frozen. The film has received positive reviews from critics and in same year she named one of the "55 Faces of the Future" in Nylon's young Hollywood issue. She appeared in Hatchet II, in which she reprised her Frozen role in an uncredited cameo. Also in 2010, Bell portrayed the role of Amy, the younger sister of Andrea (Laurie Holden) in Season 1 of the AMC drama series The Walking Dead. In 2011, Bell starred as Molly Harper, the female lead character, in the 2011 thriller-horror film Final Destination 5.

Bell starred in two television pilots through NBC but neither resulted in becoming full series, Reconstruction in 2011 and Midnight Sun in 2012. In September 2012, it was announced that Bell had signed on as a series regular on the second season of TNT's drama series Dallas. She played the role of Emma Judith Ryland Brown, Ann Ewing's (Brenda Strong) and Harris Ryland's (Mitch Pileggi) daughter, and Judith Brown Ryland's (Judith Light) granddaughter. In 2013, Bell also starred in independent films Life Inside Out, Bipolar, and See You in Valhalla.

In 2016, Bell played young Emily Dickinson in the drama film A Quiet Passion starring Cynthia Nixon. She made her directing debut with short film Scratch (2016), receiving multiple Festival Awards. She later directed and wrote short film Between the Pines. On television, she has appeared on Law & Order: Special Victims Unit, American Horror Story: Roanoke and NCIS. She starred alongside Dan Fogler in the upcoming drama film The Argument directed by Robert Schwartzman.

Personal life
On October 6, 2018, Bell married fellow actor Camron Robertson. On October 28, 2020, she gave birth to their first child, a daughter.

Filmography

Film

Television

Music videos

Award and nominations

References

External links

 
 

1986 births
Living people
21st-century American actresses
Actresses from New Jersey
American child actresses
American film actresses
American soap opera actresses
American television actresses
Hunterdon Central Regional High School alumni
People from Flemington, New Jersey
People from Readington Township, New Jersey
People from Woodstown, New Jersey